The Václav Havel Human Rights Prize is an annual €60,000 award which honours "outstanding" civil society action in defence of human rights, in Europe and beyond. Individuals, non-governmental organisations and institutions working to defend human rights anywhere in the world may be nominated. Seven of the ten winners to date were in detention because of their human rights activities at the time they received the prize.

History
The award was established in 2013 by the Parliamentary Assembly of the Council of Europe, the Václav Havel Library and the Charta 77 Foundation  and is awarded in memory of Václav Havel, former President of Czechoslovakia and the Czech Republic. It replaces the Council of Europe Parliamentary Assembly Human Rights Prize, which was created in 2009 and awarded every two years. The prize is one of a number that are awarded by different institutions of the Council of Europe and should not be confused with the Václav Havel Prize for Creative Dissent, with which it has no connection.

The prize is decided by a jury consisting of the President of the Parliamentary Assembly and six independent personalities with expertise in human rights issues. The jury draws up a shortlist of three nominees in September each year, before deciding on an overall winner in October. The prize is awarded at a special ceremony which takes place during the autumn plenary session of the Parliamentary Assembly in Strasbourg. The former Czech First Lady, Dagmar Havlová, is invited to attend. Each year, the Václav Havel Library organises a conference in Prague in honour of the prizewinner.

The agreement on the creation of the award was signed at the Czernin Palace in Prague on March 25, 2013 by the President of the Parliamentary Assembly of the Council of Europe Jean-Claude Mignon, Marta Smolíková for the Václav Havel Library and Professor František Janouch for the Charta 77 Foundation. The event was hosted by the First Deputy Prime Minister and Minister of Foreign Affairs of the Czech Republic Karel Schwarzenberg. Half of the €60,000 prize is contributed by the Parliamentary Assembly and half by the Czech Foreign Ministry.

Prizewinners 

Winners of the Council of Europe Parliamentary Assembly Human Rights Prize, which preceded the Vaclav Havel Human Rights Prize:
 2011 – Committee against Torture (Komitet Protiv Pytok), a Russian NGO, for its work to assist victims of serious human rights abuses in Russia, and to conduct independent investigations alongside official state investigations, notably in the Chechen Republic.
 2009 – British Irish Human Rights Watch (now known as  Rights Watch UK), a British NGO, for its work to monitor the human rights dimension of the conflict in Northern Ireland and combat impunity in the region.

Nomination procedure 
An annual "call for candidates" is issued in January each year. At least five "sponsors" must nominate candidates for the Prize, ahead of an annual deadline, normally fixed for the end of April. Nominations are made online, via a page on the Assembly's website, in either of the two official languages of the Council of Europe, English or French. According to the prize regulations, sponsors must give details of the candidate's work to defend human rights, and provide supporting documentation. Three candidates are shortlisted in September, with the final selection being made in October, just ahead of an award ceremony in Strasbourg.

See also 
 Václav Havel Prize for Creative Dissent

References

External links
Václav Havel Human Rights Prize page

Awards established in 2013
European human rights awards
Parliamentary Assembly of the Council of Europe